The Triangular Hockey League began as an agreement between Harvard, Princeton and Yale to play one another in best-of-three series during the season.

History
The Triangular League followed a similar pattern to the Intercollegiate Hockey League, which had existed before World War I but rather than expand to include other teams as they had previously, the Trianular league remained a 3-team conference. The future Ivy League squads were typically considered the cream of college ice hockey during the 1920s and, as a result, the League champion would often claim to be the Eastern hockey champion. The League lasted seven years and ended when Harvard and Princeton discontinued their season series in 1927.

Members

Membership timeline

See also
 Intercollegiate Hockey Association
 Intercollegiate Hockey League
 Pentagonal League

References

Defunct NCAA Division I ice hockey conferences
Sports in the Eastern United States